Everest is a city in Brown County, Kansas, United States.  As of the 2020 census, the population of the city was 265.

History
Everest had its start about 1882 by the building of the railroad through that territory. It was named in honor of Colonel Aaron S. Everest, an attorney for the Central Branch Union Pacific Railroad who represented Atchison County in the Kansas Senate.

Geography
Everest is located at  (39.676743, -95.425269).

Demographics

2010 census
As of the census of 2010, there were 284 people, 126 households, and 79 families residing in the city. The racial makeup of the city was 91.5% White, 1.1% African American, 2.1% Native American, 4.2% from other races, and 1.1% from two or more races. Hispanic or Latino of any race were 4.9% of the population.

There were 126 households, of which 29.4% had children under the age of 18 living with them, 48.4% were married couples living together, 10.3% had a female householder with no husband present, 4.0% had a male householder with no wife present, and 37.3% were non-families. 32.5% of all households were made up of individuals, and 15.1% had someone living alone who was 65 years of age or older. The average household size was 2.25 and the average family size was 2.84.

The median age in the city was 40.2 years. 25.7% of residents were under the age of 18; 4.6% were between the ages of 18 and 24; 24.6% were from 25 to 44; 30.7% were from 45 to 64; and 14.4% were 65 years of age or older. The gender makeup of the city was 49.3% male and 50.7% female.

2000 census
As of the census of 2000, there were 314 people, 135 households, and 90 families residing in the city. The racial makeup of the city was 90.76% White, 2.87% African American, 4.78% Native American, 0.32% from other races, and 1.27% from two or more races. Hispanic or Latino of any race were 2.23% of the population.

There were 135 households, out of which 31.1% had children under the age of 18 living with them, 57.0% were married couples living together, 6.7% had a female householder with no husband present, and 33.3% were non-families. 28.9% of all households were made up of individuals, and 20.7% had someone living alone who was 65 years of age or older. The average household size was 2.33 and the average family size was 2.89.

In the city, the population was spread out, with 25.2% under the age of 18, 9.9% from 18 to 24, 25.8% from 25 to 44, 20.7% from 45 to 64, and 18.5% who were 65 years of age or older. The median age was 38 years. For every 100 females, there were 93.8 males. For every 100 females age 18 and over, there were 89.5 males.

The median income for a household in the city was $27,500, and the median income for a family was $40,000. Males had a median income of $24,500 versus $23,438 for females. The per capita income for the city was $14,056. About 8.3% of families and 12.3% of the population were below the poverty line, including 12.8% of those under age 18 and 16.7% of those age 65 or over.

Education
Everest is a part of USD 430 South Brown County. The district high school is Horton High School. The Horton High School mascot is Horton Chargers.

Everest High School was closed through school unification. The Everest High School mascot was Everest Vikings.

References

External links

 Everest - Directory of Public Officials
 USD 430, local school district
 Everest city map, KDOT

Cities in Kansas
Cities in Brown County, Kansas
1882 establishments in Kansas
Populated places established in 1882